Samuel Charles Mazzuchelli, O.P. (November 4, 1806 – February 23, 1864) was a pioneer Italian Dominican friar and Catholic missionary priest who helped bring the church to the Iowa-Illinois-Wisconsin tri-state area. He founded several parishes in the area and was the architect for several parish buildings. Additionally, Mazzuchelli established several schools throughout the region, some of which have developed into local Catholic colleges. As part of this effort, he founded the Sinsinawa Dominican Sisters.

Life

Early life

He was born Carlo Gaetano Samuele Mazzuchelli on November 4, 1806, in Milan—then under French control, the 16th of 17 children of a prominent family. At the age of 17, he entered the Dominican Order, which was still recovering from the devastation wrought on the Catholic Church institutions in Italy under the French Revolutionary Army. After his period of novitiate, when he changed his name to Friar Samuel, he went to Rome to prepare for ordination. He was ordained a subdeacon in 1827 in the Lateran Basilica, around which time he was recruited to serve in new Diocese of Cincinnati, still missionary territory for the Church.

After spending some time in France to perfect his French, in 1828, Mazzuchelli set out for the United States, where he arrived in Cincinnati and was welcomed by the bishop, his fellow Dominican friar, Edward Fenwick.

Missionary priest
After obtaining a dispensation from the Holy See due to his being underage, Mazzuchelli was ordained a priest by Fenwick on September 5, 1830. Shortly after that, he was sent to serve at Sainte Anne Church on Mackinac Island and later in northern Wisconsin, After about five years there,  Mazzuchelli arrived in the Dubuque area. During his time, he faced a number of challenges, such as hostility from other Christian denominations.

While in what would later become Dubuque, Iowa, he reorganized the parish and named it Saint Raphael, which later became the Cathedral parish when the Dubuque Diocese was formed in 1837. He assisted Bishop Mathias Loras during the first few years after the founding of the diocese. He worked extensively in what would eventually become the Diocese of Madison, Wisconsin. There he founded over 30 parishes and designed and built over 20 church buildings and several civic buildings. Three of those parishes were named after the three Archangels: Saint Raphael's in Dubuque, St. Michael's in Galena, Illinois, and Saint Gabriel's in Prairie du Chien, Wisconsin. In 1846, he founded Sinsinawa Mound College. In 1847, he founded the Sinsinawa Dominican Sisters. In 1848, he founded St. Clara Female Academy (now Dominican University), a frontier school for young women, which he entrusted to the Dominican Sisters.

Many remembered Mazzuchelli as a kind and gentlemanly priest. He was able to break down the cultural barriers that existed and appeal to many different ethnic groups. The Irish he ministered to called him "Father Matthew Kelly." He died on February 23, 1864, after contracting an illness from a sick parishioner. Mazzuchelli was buried at St. Patrick's Cemetery in Benton.

Veneration

Over the years, a case for elevating him to Sainthood has been pending with the church. It started in 1964 when William Patrick O'Connor, the first Bishop of Madison, established a Diocesan Historical Commission to determine if documents available were sufficient for the Church to proceed with initial steps required in the process of beatification. The process progressed and was accepted by the Holy See for further investigation. In 1993, Pope John Paul II declared Mazzuchelli Venerable.

In preparation for the 200th anniversary of Mazzuchelli's birth in November 2006, those campaigning for Mazzuchelli to be elevated to sainthood began several activities to draw attention to that particular cause. The Sinsinawa Dominican sisters have been particularly active in this campaign.

In August 2008, an official inquiry into a presumed miracle performed through the intercession of Mazzuchelli was completed in the Diocese of Madison. Robert Uselmann, a resident of Monona, Wisconsin, had gone to Sinsinawa Mound with his family in 2001 to pray to Mazzuchelli for his intercession in curing him of cancer. While there, he prayed with the Sisters, using Mazzuchelli's penance chain. Uselmann later discovered that a cancerous tumor had disappeared from his lung.

Robert C. Morlino, Bishop of the Diocese of Madison, opened a diocesan tribunal at the Sinsinawa Dominican Sisters' request, which concluded its non-judgmental investigation and sent the results to Rome. If the Congregation for the Causes of Saints rules that Uselmann's healing is judged miraculous, Mazzuchelli would be eligible for beatification, the next step in the process of naming a saint within the Church.

Legacy
In 2006 a new middle school built by the Holy Family Catholic School System in Dubuque was named after Mazzuchelli. The school opened for the 2006–2007 academic year.

Parishes founded by Fr. Mazzuchelli

This list is incomplete. You can help by adding to it.

References

Further reading
 Mazzuchelli, Samuel. The Memoirs of Father Samuel Mazzuchelli, O.P. Chicago: Priory Press, 1967.
 McGreal, Mary Nona. Samuel Mazzuchelli: American Dominican, Journeyman, Preacher, Pastor, Teacher. Notre Dame, IN: Ave Maria Press, 2005.

External links
 Samuel Mazzuchelli at Encyclopedia Dubuque
 Samuel Mazzuchelli at The Biographical Dictionary of Iowa
 The Apostle of the Upper Midwest: Samuel Mazzuchelli
 Fr. Samuel Mazzuchelli: an inspiration in the Year of Faith
 
 The Sinsinawa Dominican Sisters

1806 births
1864 deaths
Italian Dominicans
Religious leaders from Milan
Religious leaders from Wisconsin
People from Lafayette County, Wisconsin
People from Dubuque, Iowa
Venerated Dominicans
19th-century venerated Christians
Italian emigrants to the United States
American Dominicans
Catholics from Wisconsin
Catholics from Iowa
American venerated Catholics
19th-century American Roman Catholic priests